James Flannery may refer to:

 James Fortescue Flannery (1851–1943), English engineer, naval architect, and politician
 James Flannery (Ohio politician) (1938–2005), member of the Ohio House of Representatives